Karate at the 2011 Southeast Asian Games was held in Jakarta, Indonesia.

Medal summary

Men

Women

Medal table

2011 Southeast Asian Games events
2011 in karate
2011